Operation Fortune: Ruse de Guerre is a 2023 spy action comedy film directed by Guy Ritchie, and written by Ritchie, Ivan Atkinson, and Marn Davies. The film stars Jason Statham, Aubrey Plaza, Josh Hartnett, Cary Elwes, Bugzy Malone and Hugh Grant. The film is about a spy, Orson Fortune (Statham), who must retrieve a stolen high-tech device before an arms dealer can sell it to the highest bidder. 

Operation Fortune: Ruse de Guerre was theatrically released in international territories on January 4, 2023, and theatrically released in the United States on March 3. It is scheduled for release digitally on Amazon Prime Video in the United Kingdom on April 7.

Plot
A gang of Ukrainian mobsters manage to steal a device known as "The Handle"; its worth estimated at billions of dollars. The British government hires Nathan Jasmine to retrieve the Handle before billionaire arms dealer Greg Simmonds can sell it to the highest bidder. Nathan hires super-spy Orson Fortune to lead a team made up of Sarah Fidel, JJ Davies and others. The team travels to Madrid, seeking the courier intended to transport the hard drive containing the data from the Handle. 

Their search is interrupted by a rival of Nathan's, who seems to have also been hired to retrieve the Handle. Sarah manages to copy the hard drive's contents first. Learning that Simmonds plans to host a charity gala in Cannes, the team decides to infiltrate it by blackmailing Simmonds' favorite movie star, Danny Francesco, into helping them distract Simmonds. Simmonds encourages Danny to spend some time in his Turkish villa in Antalya. Orson infiltrates the Ukrainian mafia house to hack their computers, disguising it as a robbery. The British government warns Nathan that the Handle is an advanced AI that can be programmed to defeat any security system in the world. 

Learning that the exchange for the Handle will take place in Antalya, the team travels to Turkey. While Simmonds shows Danny his memorabilia, Orson and JJ track down one of Simmonds' moles in the Turkish government. Orson, disguising as Simmonds' lawyer, attends the exchange and finalizes it, before Mike and his men interfere, kill almost everyone and steal the Handle - which makes it clear that Mike went rogue and was working independently.

In spite of the problems the team has caused him, Simmonds is willing to help, because Mike stealing the Handle cost Simmonds his commission. He tells them that the buyers were two bio-tech moguls, Trent and Arnold, who have been hoarding gold and intend to use the Handle to cause a worldwide financial collapse. Confronting them, Orson manages to retrieve the Handle.

In Doha, the team is offered another job, but they decide to go on vacation. Orson tells them he has used the proceeds from the robbery at the Ukrainians' villa to finance Danny's new film.

Cast

Production
The screenplay was written by Ivan Atkinson, Marn Davies, and Ritchie. Produced by Miramax, the project will be distributed by Lionsgate. In December 2020, Aubrey Plaza joined the cast. In January 2021, the cast was rounded out with Cary Elwes, Bugzy Malone and Josh Hartnett in supporting roles. In February 2021, Hugh Grant joined the cast.

Principal photography commenced on January 14, 2021, with filming taking place in Antalya, Turkey, Farnborough and Qatar. Previously known as Five Eyes (in reference to the intelligence alliance), the film was officially renamed Operation Fortune: Ruse de Guerre in September 2021.

Release
Operation Fortune: Ruse de Guerre was scheduled to be released by STX Entertainment. It was originally scheduled for release on January 21, 2022, and March 18, 2022. On February 18, 2022, the film was pulled from the release schedule without comment by the studio. Reports indicate the film was pulled from release, not due to the COVID-19 pandemic as before, but because it featured gangsters of Ukrainian nationality as the main antagonist Greg Simmonds' henchmen. The film's producers thought it would be of bad taste, in light of the ongoing Russo-Ukrainian War sparking global outrage, for the film to present "Ukrainian baddies". In November 2022, amid STX's restructuring, it was reported that the film would likely be released domestically through a streaming service, while its international distributors would still proceed with releasing the film theatrically, which began on January 4, 2023. On February 13, 2023, Lionsgate was revealed to have bought the U.S. distribution rights and announced the film's theatrically release date of March 3, 2023. It was then reported that the film would be released in the United Kingdom on April 7, 2023, on Amazon Prime Video.

Reception

Box office
, Operation Fortune: Ruse de Guerre has grossed $6.3 million in the United States and Canada, and $31.2 million in other territories, for a worldwide total of $37.5 million.

In United States, the film was released alongside Creed III and Demon Slayer: Kimetsu no Yaiba - To the Swordsmith Village, was projected to gross $3-6 million from 2,150 theaters in its opening weekend. The film made $1 million on its first day, including $220,000 from Thursday night previews. It went on to debut to $3.1 million, finishing in seventh.

Critical response

On Rotten Tomatoes, the film has an approval rating of 52% based on 126 reviews, with an average rating of 5.6/10. The site's critical consensus reads, "Operation Fortune can't keep up with the best modern action movies, but it's got just enough firepower for viewers seeking a few undemanding thrills." On Metacritic, the film has a weighted average score of 50 out of 100, based on 31 critics, indicating "mixed or average reviews". Audiences surveyed by CinemaScore gave the film an average grade of "B+" on an A+ to F scale.

John Li of Geek Culture gave it a rating of 7.4 out of 10, and praised the plot, making of the movie, and especially the character of Statham stating: "Fortune is probably not the most realistic character we’ve seen on the big screen (we don’t watch spy movies to believe their super abilities are existent in real life anyway), but you can bet he is oozing with charisma." Pat Brown of Slant Magazine gave it 1 out of 4 and wrote: "Promising but failing to deliver the colorful characters and winding, breakneck plot of a caper, Operation Fortune may itself be a ruse, but it’s not a convincing one."

References

External links
 
 

2023 action comedy films
2020s English-language films
2020s spy comedy films
2020s American films
2020s British films
American action comedy films
American spy comedy films
British action comedy films
British spy comedy films
Films about actors
Films about terrorism
Films directed by Guy Ritchie
Films produced by Bill Block
Films produced by Jason Statham
Films shot in Qatar
Films shot in Turkey
Films with screenplays by Guy Ritchie
Miramax films
STX Entertainment films
Lionsgate films
Film controversies
Obscenity controversies in film
Political controversies in film
Film controversies in the United States
Film controversies in Ukraine
Films set in Turkey